Michael James Briscoe (born 4 July 1983) is an English footballer who plays as a defender for Stourbridge.

Career

Harpole
Born in Northampton, Northamptonshire, Briscoe started his career with his local Northamptonshire based club Harpole F.C.

Coventry City
He joined Coventry City after just one season with Harpole. Briscoe spent a season with The Sky Blues, and started the season off strongly managing to find the net once in his short spell, however he picked up an injury towards the end of the season.

Macclesfield Town
Briscoe then moved on to join League Two side Macclesfield Town on 3 June 2004. During his time with the club he made 98 appearances and found the nine times, a significant improvement from last season, but was released on 9 May 2006.

Burton Albion loan
Briscoe was sent out to Burton Albion on 8 March 2005. He made 21 appearances, and found the net on two occasinos  in the short time he was there.

Hucknall Town
Not even a month had passed following Briscoe's release from Macclesfield when he joined Nottinghamshire based club Hucknall Town of the Conference North in May 2006. He made 43 appearances and 4 goals

Tamworth
Briscoe joined Conference National side Tamworth initially on a month's loan on 20 January 2007, having previously worked with new manager Gary Mills during his time on the coaching staff at Coventry. Briscoe's loan move was later extended to the end of the season.

On 17 May 2007, Briscoe joined Tamworth on a permanent deal, after spending the most part of the following season on loan with The Lambs.

Briscoe also revealed he turned down moves to League Two clubs Wrexham and former club Macclesfield and Conference outfit Stafford Rangers and stated that the arrival of Gerry Taggart had excited him and looked forward to playing alongside the former Bolton Wanderers and Leicester City man at the heart of the Lambs defence.

Halesowen Town
Briscoe joined Halesowen Town during at the end of his 2007/08 campaign with Tamworth in the Conference North.

Kidderminster Harriers
On 1 July 2010 he signed for Conference side Kidderminster Harriers, four years after having a pre-season trial with the club. At the end of the 2011/12 season his contract ran out and left the club.

AFC Telford
On 28 June 2012 he joined neighbours AFC Telford. Due to injuries he only played 17 league games. On 11 May 2013 it was announced he was released by Telford with 5 other players.

References

External links

1983 births
Living people
Footballers from Northampton
English footballers
Association football defenders
Coventry City F.C. players
Macclesfield Town F.C. players
Burton Albion F.C. players
Hucknall Town F.C. players
Tamworth F.C. players
Halesowen Town F.C. players
Redditch United F.C. players
Kidderminster Harriers F.C. players
AFC Telford United players
English Football League players
National League (English football) players
Stourbridge F.C. players